The 13th Filmfare Awards South Ceremony honoring the winners of the best of South Indian cinema in 1965 was an event held on 1966.

Awards

References

 Filmfare Magazine 1966.

General

External links
 
 

Filmfare Awards South